"I Guess That's Why They Call It the Blues" is a song by English musician Elton John, with music by John and Davey Johnstone and lyrics by Bernie Taupin. It is the first single from John's 17th studio album Too Low for Zero. In the United States, it became one of John's biggest hits of the 1980s, holding at No. 2 for four weeks on the Adult Contemporary chart, and reaching No. 4 on the Billboard Hot 100. It also reached the top ten in five countries including the UK, peaking at number five. It was the first single since 1975 to feature the classic lineup of the Elton John Band.

It features Stevie Wonder on harmonica. The song received largely favourable reviews, with Bill Janovitz of AllMusic declaring the song "likely to stand the test of time as a standard." The song was also featured on the film soundtrack to Peter's Friends in 1992.

Performances
John has performed the song, a fan favourite, live numerous times, occasionally playing it as part of a medley with his hit "Blue Eyes" (from the 1982 album Jump Up!).

The song was later performed live by Mary J. Blige and Elton John, and this version of the song was part of the Mary J. Blige & Friends EP. A live version of the song with Mary J. Blige also appeared on John's One Night Only – The Greatest Hits live compilation, recorded in Madison Square Garden in October 2000. Another live version, this one featuring just Elton John and basic rhythm section, was recorded live in Verona in 1996 during John's appearance with Luciano Pavarotti as part of the master tenor's Pavarotti and Friends for War Child benefit concerts.

Music video
The original music video, one of twenty directed for John by Australian Russell Mulcahy, tells the story of two 1950s-era young lovers who are separated when the man is forced to leave for National Service, depicting the trials and tribulations he experiences there, and then are finally reunited at the end of the song. It was filmed in the Rivoli Ballroom in London and at Colchester Garrison Barracks, Essex.

Track listings
US 7-inch single
 "I Guess That's Why They Call It the Blues"
 "The Retreat"

UK 7-inch single
 "I Guess That's Why They Call It the Blues"
 "Choc Ice Goes Mental"

Personnel
 Elton John – vocals, acoustic piano, keyboards
 Davey Johnstone – electric guitar, acoustic guitar, backing vocals
 Dee Murray – bass, backing vocals
 Nigel Olsson – drums, backing vocals
 Stevie Wonder – harmonica

Charts

Weekly charts

Year-end charts

Certifications

Covers
The song was covered by James Blunt and released in the UK on the compilation album BBC Radio 2: Sounds of the 80s on 7 November 2014.
Canadian singer Alessia Cara covered the song for the 2018 tribute album Revamp & Restoration.

References

External links

 Lyrics for "I Guess That's Why They Call It the Blues" at Bernietaupin.com
 

Songs about blues
1983 singles
Elton John songs
Geffen Records singles
Music videos directed by Russell Mulcahy
Songs with music by Elton John
Songs with lyrics by Bernie Taupin
Song recordings produced by Chris Thomas (record producer)
1983 songs
The Rocket Record Company singles